Wyręba  (until 1947 Dumna Góra) is a village in the administrative district of Gmina Siekierczyn. It lies within Lubań County, Lower Silesian Voivodeship, in south-western Poland.

References

Villages in Lubań County